Charles Arthur Crossley (17 December 1891 – 29 April 1965) was an English professional football inside forward who played in the Football League for Everton, Sunderland, Swindon Town and West Ham United. He later player-managed Ebbw Vale in non-league football.

Personal life 
Crossley served as a stoker on a Royal Navy submarine during the First World War.

Career statistics

Honours 
West Ham United

 Football League Second Division second-place promotion: 1922–23

References

1891 births
1965 deaths
Footballers from Birmingham, West Midlands
English footballers
Association football inside forwards
Willenhall F.C. players
Hednesford Town F.C. players
Walsall F.C. players
Sunderland A.F.C. players
Everton F.C. players
West Ham United F.C. players
Swindon Town F.C. players
Ebbw Vale F.C. players
English Football League players
Royal Navy personnel of World War I
Tottenham Hotspur F.C. wartime guest players
Clapton Orient F.C. wartime guest players
Huddersfield Town A.F.C. wartime guest players
Southern Football League managers
Southern Football League players
English football managers